The Pau Hunt was established in 1842 by the Société d’Encouragement as a spectacule authorized by the government of Louis Philippe to hunt predatory animals such as wolves and foxes. Internationally, the Pau Hunt, dominated by American and British Masters, was one of the most renown hunts until the breakout of World War II. Its country, between Gardères and the hills surrounding Pau was nicknamed “Leicestershire in France”.

Innovative hunt masters and committee members organized their first recorded drag hunt in 1847. They organized the capture of game and its later release at meets as early as the 1850s, cross country matches and point-to-point races in the 1890s.

In 1947 the association reorganized as the "Pau Hunt Drags". Continuing its tradition of drag hunting, meets are held in unplanted fields with the expressed permission of amiable property owners.<ref 

A plethora of private photos, articles, publications, photos and works of art during its heyday are housed in private collections, including the collection of the English Club of Pau.

Notes

References

Sports clubs established in the 19th century
Sports clubs established in 1842
Dog sports
Equestrian sports
Hunting
Hunting with hounds
Fox hunting
Pau, Pyrénées-Atlantiques